Yacoub G. Al-Atrash is a music composer and maestro from Palestine. Over the years, Yacoub has participated and performed in festivals such as International Festival of Carthage, Jerash Festival, and Mawazine.

Yacoub has led orchestras with artists such as Mohammed Assaf, Assala, Omar Al-Abdallat, and Hany Shaker.

Biography
Yacoub was born in 1978 in the town of Beit Sahour in Palestine. His father is an olivewood artist known for making ouds from olivewood. From an early age, he was interested in musical instruments, especially the oud and learned the art from his father.

Yacoub studied music at the Jordan Academy of Music. He then came back to Palestine to continue studying the Oud at Edward Said National Conservatory of Music.

In 2007, he founded Awtar Studio. In the following year, he started the band Awtar which included 18 musicians.

In 2012, he composed the music for Nimrod play. In the following year, he composed the soundtrack for Outside the Place.

In 2014, his work, Palestine Light of Hope, received the Palestine International Award.

In 2021, he started Our Voices with Your Songs project.

Awards and recognition
2014: Palestine International Award

References

Palestinian composers
1978 births
Living people